The French football league system is a series of interconnected leagues for club football in France and Monaco, and includes one Spanish side. At the top two levels of the system is the Ligue de Football Professionnel, which consists of two professional national divisions, Ligue 1 and Ligue 2. Below that are a number of leagues run by the Fédération Française de Football. At level 3 is the semi-professional Championnat National. Below that is the amateur Championnat National 2 (level 4), which is divided into four parallel regional divisions, followed by the Championnat National 3 (level 5), which is divided into 12 parallel regional divisions. Underneath that are many more regional and departmental leagues and divisions. Clubs finishing the season at or near the top of their division may be eligible for promotion to a higher division. Similarly, clubs finishing at or near the bottom of their division may be relegated to a lower division.

Men

National leagues 
Starting in 2017–18 there were changes at levels 3 and 4 (in name only) and level 5 (significant restructuring and rename).

Regional leagues 
For the 2019–20 season, this was the structure of the regional leagues, operating directly below the national leagues.

Departmental leagues 
For the 2019–20 season, this was the structure of the departmental leagues, operating at various levels below the regional leagues.

Auvergne-Rhône-Alpes region

Bourgogne-Franche-Comté region

Brittany region

Centre-Val de Loire region

Corsica region 
There are no district divisions in Corsica

Grand Est region

Hauts-de-France region

Méditerranée Region

Normandy region

Nouvelle Aquitaine region

Occitanie region

Paris Île-de-France region 
Clubs in the arrondissements of Paris are divided between the three surrounding suburban districts. The District of Hauts-de-Seine includes 6th, 7th, 8th, 14th, 15th, 16th and 17th, the District of Seine-Saint-Denis has the 9th, 10th, 11th, 18th, 19th, 20th and the District of Val-de-Marne includes 1st, 2nd, 3rd, 4th, 5th, 12th and 13th.

Pays de la Loire region

Women

National leagues 
Until 2022–23 :

From 2023–24 onwards :

References

External links
 FFF Regional Leagues
 FFF Districts
  League321.com - French football league tables, records & statistics database.

  
France